Catharine Johnston ( Charles; 1794–1871) was an English botanical illustrator who had a species of marine animal named in her honour.

Life and work

Catharine Charles was born in 1794 and was the daughter of William Claudius Charles, a surgeon who had worked in the West Indies. On 23 November 1819, she married George Johnston, a naturalist, and moved to Berwick-on-Tweed, where the couple resided permanently.

Johnston took an active interest in the study of natural history. She assisted her husband in his natural history investigations and illustrated his publications with scientific drawings. She signed her works C. Johnston. On 21 December 1831, she was made an "Extraordinary member" of the Berwickshire Naturalists' Club. Her drawings assisted other notable scientists to further their research.

In 1853 Philip Henry Gosse named the marine species Tomopteris (Johnstonella) catharina in her honor stating:

References

Women naturalists
19th-century British women scientists
British women illustrators
British illustrators
Natural history illustrators